Cathleen is a feminine given name in the English language. It is a variant form of Kathleen. Notable people with the name include:

 Cathleen Chaffee, American curator, art historian, writer
 Cathleen Falsani, American journalist and writer
 Cathleen Galgiani, American politician
 Cathleen Nesbitt, English actress
 Cathleen Rund, German Olympic swimmer
 Cathleen Schine, American author
 Cathleen Synge Morawetz, Canadian mathematician
 Lady Cathleen Hudson, younger daughter of John Granville Cornwallis Eliot, 6th Earl of St Germans

References

English feminine given names
Irish feminine given names